Come to Life is the fourth studio album released by Australian singer-songwriter Natalie Imbruglia. It became the first album to be released on her self-funded label, Malabar Records.

Songwriting
Although recording for the album began in 2007, during promotion for the release of Glorious: The Singles 1997–2007, tracks "Scars" and "My God" were rumoured to have been recorded in 2006. The album took nearly three years to complete. In February 2009, The Sun newspaper rumoured that Imbruglia was collaborating with Chris Martin from Coldplay, and it was later confirmed by Martin himself and people involved in the recording process that he had worked with Imbruglia on a "string of tracks".

Chris Martin wrote the song "Fun" for Natalie. "When he sang it to me, I almost did one of those ugly cries. But I held it together. That's the crazy thing - he wrote it, not me. Who knows what Chris was thinking, you would have to ask him about that. But I thought it was a stunning, beautiful love song". The song "Lukas", produced by Brian Eno and Rik Simpson, was confirmed as an out-take from the recording sessions of Coldplay's fourth studio album, Viva la Vida or Death and All His Friends. Martin also worked with Imbruglia on "Want", with his voice echoing at the end of the song. "Coldplay write so much material it's quite ridiculous how many songs they have, some of which never get finished because Chris Martin is a bit of a mad genius," Imbruglia explained.

In April 2009, Imbruglia stated the following in an interview: "I get frustrated because I’d like to produce more work... It’s something that bugs me about myself, but I don’t really know any other way. And I’m not motivated by money, so I need to get things done right. I feel the same creative buzz I felt when I first started my career... It's just fun and artistic and creative and all the things it should be. There's still a lot of depth to the songs... It just sounds fresher to me. I've tried different things - there's more electronic stuff in there, and that's different for me, more dance beats. There's a freedom overall, and a sense of confidence. It's slightly less introspective..." The album "combines dark, driving beats and gorgeously wistful ballads".

Release
The album was first released via on Island Records on 2 October 2009 in Australia. It was announced that the release of the album in the United Kingdom would be delayed so that Imbruglia could concentrate on her duties as a judge on the Australian version of The X Factor franchise. The album was eventually made available in the United Kingdom on 14 February 2010 by Amazon. In 2020, the album became available for streaming in its entirety on Spotify and its tracks were made available on YouTube by Universal Music.

Singles
 "Wild About It" was released as a promotional single. A music video was filmed for the song in London, England, and was directed by Mike Baldwin. The video features cameo appearances by British comedians Alan Carr and David Walliams.
 "Want" was officially released as the album's lead single on 28 September 2009. Released only as a digital download, the track reached number six on the Italian singles chart and number 88 on the UK singles chart.
 "Scars" was intended to become the second single from the album, due to be released on 26 April 2010, however, due to contractual issues with the record label, was cancelled. It was announced three weeks later the single would actually be released on 5 July, nearly a year after the previous single, "Want" was released, but once again, the release was cancelled.

Scars

"Scars" was due to be the second and final single from Australian singer Come to Life. The single was originally due to be released on 26 April 2010, but, due to contractual issues with the record label, was cancelled. The digital download was made available for a short time on Amazon, but was later removed upon a request from the record company. It was announced in June that a physical release of the single would be available from 5 July 2010, nearly a year after the previous single, "Want", was released. Come July, however, no copies of the single made it to the shelves. As of August 2010, all sources of the physical single and digital download have cancelled the release. The video for the song was recorded and directed by Max & Dania, and was due to be released on 14 March 2010. However, it was later postponed following a request by Imbruglia.

Chart performance
Come to Life entered the Australian albums chart at #67 on 19 October 2009, making it Imbruglia's worst performing album to date. It sold 740 copies in its first week of release. In its second week, it dropped to #89, spending only two weeks in the top 100. In Switzerland, the album peaked at #70 on 18 October 2009.

Track listing

Charts

Release history

References

External links

2009 albums
Natalie Imbruglia albums
Albums produced by Leo Abrahams
Albums produced by Brian Eno
Albums produced by Rik Simpson
albums produced by Ben Hillier